Massachusetts House of Representatives' 8th Middlesex district in the United States is one of 160 legislative districts included in the lower house of the Massachusetts General Court. It covers parts of Middlesex County and Worcester County. Democrat Carolyn Dykema of Holliston represented the district from 2009 until her resignation to take a private sector job in 2022.

Towns represented
The district as drawn with 2010 census data includes the following localities:
 Holliston
 Hopkinton
 Southborough
 one precinct of Westborough

This district boundary overlaps those of the Massachusetts Senate's 2nd Middlesex and Norfolk district and its Middlesex and Worcester district.

The new boundaries, drawn from 2020 census data, include:

 Holliston
 Hopkinton
 part of Millis
 Sherborn

Former locale
The district previously covered part of Cambridge, circa 1872.

Representatives
 Sedgwick L. Plumer, circa 1858 
 Edward J. Collins, circa 1858-1859 
 Thomas Rice, Jr, circa 1859 
 Theodore P. Dresser, circa 1888 
 James F. Leland, circa 1920 
 James Alan Hodder, circa 1951 
 William I. Randall, circa 1951 
 Mary Fantasia, circa 1975 
 Andrew Natsios, 1975-1987
 Barbara A. Gardner, 1987-2001 
 Paul Loscocco, 2001–2009
 Carolyn Dykema, 2009-2022

See also
 List of Massachusetts House of Representatives elections
 List of Massachusetts General Courts
 List of former districts of the Massachusetts House of Representatives
 Other Middlesex County districts of the Massachusetts House of Representatives: 1st, 2nd, 3rd, 4th, 5th, 6th, 7th, 9th, 10th, 11th, 12th, 13th, 14th, 15th, 16th, 17th, 18th, 19th, 20th, 21st, 22nd, 23rd, 24th, 25th, 26th, 27th, 28th, 29th, 30th, 31st, 32nd, 33rd, 34th, 35th, 36th, 37th

Images
Portraits of legislators

References

External links
 Ballotpedia
  (State House district information based on U.S. Census Bureau's American Community Survey).

House
Government of Middlesex County, Massachusetts
Government in Worcester County, Massachusetts